Norman Johnson may refer to:
Norman Johnson (priest) (1804–1890), Scottish priest
Norman Lloyd Johnson (1917–2004), British statistician
Norman Miller Johnson (1887–1949), Scottish minister and author
Norman S. Johnson, dentist and an Australian and international Scouting official
Norman Johnson (mathematician) (1930–2017), Canadian pure mathematician
Norm Johnson (ice hockey) (1932–2016), Canadian hockey player
Norm Johnson (politician) (born 1941), member of the Washington House of Representatives
General Norman Johnson (1943–2010), American musician
Norm Johnson (born 1960), American football player

See also
E. Normus Johnson, a Big Johnson character 
Norm Johnstone (1927–2013), Australian rules footballer